This documents the records and playoff results of seasons completed by the original-era Ottawa Senators ice hockey club, officially known as the Ottawa Hockey Club from the period of 1883 until 1934. The first reference to the name 'Senators' is in 1901, although the nickname only apparently came into common use in the 1910s. For the period 1903–1906, the club is best known as the 'Silver Seven', although this may be a later invention.

History
The club began as a community-based sports club, founded in 1883. In 1889, the club joined the Ottawa Amateur Athletics Club, an offshoot of the Ottawa Amateur Athletics Association. Until the latter 1890s, the association's logo was on the club's jerseys. Prior to 1893, most play was either exhibition, tournament or challenge series. Regular season round-robin play began in the 1893 season, partly due to the influence of Governor General Lord Stanley who donated his Stanley Cup at this time also. 

Over its history, the Ottawa club changed leagues regularly as leagues were disbanded over disputes and the progression from amateur community sporting club to professional hockey business. In the early 1890s, the club played in its own Ottawa City League, the Ontario Hockey Association (OHA), and the Amateur Hockey Association of Canada (AHAC) simultaneously. The club left the OHA in 1894 over a dispute over the OHA championship. The club kept a 'seconds' team in the City League, while the first team played in the AHAC. The AHAC league met its end in 1898 partly due to the Ottawa Hockey Club wanting to keep out the rival Ottawa Capitals hockey club. In 1905, the Ottawa Hockey Club left the AHAC's successor, the Canadian Amateur Hockey League (CAHL) over a dispute regarding replaying games, joining the Federal Amateur Hockey League for a season before forming the Eastern Canada Amateur Hockey Association (ECAHA).

In the period of 1906–1909, the club changed from a purely non-paid amateur club to one with a mix of amateurs and paid players, and finally fully professional. From the period of 1910 onwards, the club held a franchise in the fully professional National Hockey Association (NHA) and its descendant the National Hockey League (NHL). In 1934, the NHL franchise and players moved to St. Louis, Missouri and the organization started operating a Senators club in senior amateur and semi-professional hockey. The end of all descendants of the original Ottawa Hockey Club came in 1954 when Tommy Gorman folded the Senators organization due to declining attendance in competition with televised hockey.

Amateur era
Note: GP = Games played, W = Wins, L = Losses, T = Ties, Pts = Points, GF = Goals for, GA = Goals against

Independent
 1883–84 - Montreal Tournament and exhibitions
 1884–85 - Montreal Tournament and exhibitions
 1885–86 - Montreal Tournament was cancelled and no exhibitions were held. The club planned to play in the February 1886 Winter Carnival at Burlington, Vermont, but withdrew after the dates of the carnival were changed.

Amateur Hockey Association of Canada (AHAC) 1887–1898

Ottawa HC played AHAC challenges in the league in 1887, 1891 and 1892, however regular seasons were not played until 1893.

In the 1889 and 1890 seasons, after the opening of the new Rideau Skating Rink, Ottawa played only exhibitions games against AHAC opponents.

Ontario Hockey Association 1890–1893

 A - two games were 'friendlies'.
 B - Only one game played (semi-final against Queen's). Toronto Granite defaulted in championship.

Canadian Amateur Hockey League 1899–1904

 C Ottawa resigned February 8, 1904, playing friendlies and Cup challenges only for the balance of the hockey season.

Federal Amateur Hockey League 1904–05

Ottawa Hockey Club joined the FAHL in 1903–04 but did not play in the regular season. A series was arranged against the Montreal Wanderers for the Stanley Cup and the FAHL title. Ottawa won the series after the Wanderers withdrew in a dispute over the series after the first game was tied 5–5.

Professional era

Eastern Canada Amateur Hockey Association 1906–1909

Canadian Hockey Association 1910

League was abandoned after two games.

National Hockey Association 1910–1917

National Hockey League 1917–1934
Note: GP = Games played, W = Wins, L = Losses, T = Ties, Pts = Points, GF = Goals for, GA = Goals against, PIM= Penalties in minutes

NHL Records as of June 11, 2007.

See also
 Ottawa Senators (FHL), rival team in 1908–09 featuring Silver Seven members.
 Ottawa Senators (senior hockey), amateur / minor pro era 1934–1955
 St. Louis Eagles, relocated NHL franchise, 1934–35
 Ottawa Senators, 1992–present

References

seasons